Grey North was an electoral riding in Ontario, Canada. It was created in 1867 at the time of confederation. It was renamed and redistributed in 1967 as the riding of Grey-Bruce before being abolished in 1986 before the 1987 election. The riding represented Grey County.

Members of Provincial Parliament

References

Notes

Citations

Former provincial electoral districts of Ontario